Karlsruhe is one of the four administrative regions (sing. Regierungsbezirk) of Baden-Württemberg, Germany, located in the north-west of the state. It is subdivided into the three regional associations (sing. Regionalverband): Mittlerer Oberrhein (Middle Upper Rhine), Rhein-Neckar (Rhine-Neckar) and Nordschwarzwald (Northern Black Forest).

Economy 
The Gross domestic product (GDP) of the region was €123.3 billion in 2018, accounting for 3.7% of German economic output. GDP per capita adjusted for purchasing power was €40,400 or 134% of the EU27 average in the same year. The GDP per employee was 109% of the EU average.

Butterflies
The Regierungspräsidium garants permissions  to catch butterflies in Baden-Württemberg. The information are into the system Landesdatenbank Schmetterlinge - Staatlichen Museum für Naturkunde.

References

External links 
 

 
Geography of Baden-Württemberg
Government regions of Germany
NUTS 2 statistical regions of the European Union